Matthew Ahn is a lawyer, law professor, and politician from Ohio who twice held the Guinness World Record for fastest time to travel to all New York City Subway stations, a feat commonly known as the Subway Challenge. The New York Times has dubbed him "King of the Subway". Ahn has launched an exploratory committee to consider a run for Cuyahoga County Prosecutor in 2024.

A graduate of New York University School of Law, the self-described "transit enthusiast" has created a replica of the New York City Subway map showing only stations which are wheelchair-accessible. It has been lauded for highlighting the relative paucity of such stations. In 2017, Ahn made MTA-related headlines again when he raced a subway train between the adjacent Chambers Street and Park Place stations on foot.

Ahn has also gained recognition as a YouTube musician for his mashup of the opening number from the hit musical Hamilton with the theme song to the movie Space Jam.

In 2015, Ahn published a widely read comprehensive ranking of every Cleveland Browns loss since 1999. He appeared as a contestant on Jeopardy! in 2013.

References 

Year of birth missing (living people)
Living people
Ohio lawyers
New York University School of Law alumni